Hypocrisy is a Swedish death metal band formed in October 1991 in Ludvika by Peter Tägtgren.

History
After spending three years in Fort Lauderdale, Florida, in 1990, founder Peter Tägtgren returned to his homeland of Sweden, to form his own band. Hypocrisy's early releases were noted as being well-executed death metal, but panned for not being particularly innovative. That criticism waned as the band matured, cultivating a more distinctive sound as well as employing an introspective lyrical approach. Later releases have a more atmospheric sound, with lyrical exploration of aliens and abduction experiences.

Tägtgren's experience as a producer may also have led to the band's change in musical direction, as he is more closely involved with many other bands while producing their albums.

After twice cancelling a U.S. tour in 2009, Hypocrisy confirmed a North American tour for 2010. Joining them on the "Long Time, No Death" tour were Scar Symmetry, Hate, Blackguard and Swashbuckle. From January to March 2010, they toured Germany, Eastern Europe and Scandinavia, finishing in Moscow. Their North American tour took place in May 2010.

On 14 October 2011, Hypocrisy released a DVD called Hell Over Sofia - 20 Years of Chaos and Confusion. It contains a full concert from the "Long Time, No Death" tour. The DVD also contains a one and a half-hour documentary about the band. On 10 November 2011, Mikael Hedlund announced writing material for a new studio album during an interview with Metal Shock Finlands chief editor, Mohsen Fayyazi. Mikael tells Metal Shock Finland: 

In early 2012 the band began to write new material for a follow up to A Taste of Extreme Divinity. On 21 December 2012 Hypocrisy announced that the title of the upcoming album is End of Disclosure. It was released on 22 March 2013.

Hypocrisy's thirteenth studio album, and first in eight years, Worship was released on 26 November 2021. The album was preceded by a music video for the first single "Chemical Whore". It was later elected by Loudwire as the 32nd best metal song of 2021.

On 5 April 2022, via the band's official Facebook page, the band announced the departure of Horgh from the band. He was replaced a week later by Henrik Axelsson of The Crown.

Musical style and lyrical themes 
Musically, the band started off with a traditional death metal sound on their early albums, but soon turned into a melodic death metal band. Their early lyrics – written by original vocalist Masse Broberg – dealt with anti-Christian themes and Satanism. The band later focused on themes such as the paranormal and extraterrestrials. Their tenth album, Virus, contains themes more typical of death metal such as violence, the horrors of reality, insanity, torture, war, drug addiction, and emotional strife. Their twelfth album, End of Disclosure, uses conspiracy and anti-Illuminati themes.

Members

Current members
 Peter Tägtgren – guitars (1991–present), vocals (1993–present)
 Mikael Hedlund – bass (1991–present)
 Tomas Elofsson – guitars (2010–present) 
 Henrik Axelsson – drums (2022–present)

Former members
 Magnus "Masse" Broberg – vocals (1992–1993)
 Lars Szöke – drums (1992–2004)
 Jonas Österberg – guitars (1992)
 Mathias Kamijo – live guitars (1995–2004)
 Horgh – drums (2004–2022)
 Andreas Holma – guitars (2004–2006)
 Klas Ideberg – live guitars (2006)
Alexi Laiho – live guitars (2009)

Timeline

Discography

Studio albums

EPs

Compilation albums

Live albums

Video albums

Music videos

References

External links
 

1990 establishments in Sweden
Musical groups established in 1990
Musical quartets
Nuclear Blast artists
Swedish melodic death metal musical groups